Amanda Lucas (born 7 September 1983) is an Australian netball player. She played for the Queensland Firebirds in the Commonwealth Bank Trophy.

References
2006 Queensland Firebirds team profile. Retrieved on 2009-03-21.

Living people
Australian netball players
1983 births
Queensland Firebirds players
Commonwealth Bank Trophy players
Queensland Fusion players
Australian Netball League players